The Territorial Army (TA) of India is an auxiliary military organisation of part-time volunteers that provides support services to the Indian Army. It is composed of officers, junior commissioned officers, non-commissioned officers and other personnel holding ranks the same as in the Indian Army, who also have civilian occupations. The role of the TA is to "relieve the regular army from static duties and assist civil administration in dealing with natural calamities and maintenance of essential services", and to "provide units for the regular army as and when required".

The TA was constituted by the Territorial Army Act of 1948 in the Dominion of India as a successor to the Indian Defence Force (1917–1920) and the  Indian Territorial Force (1920–1948). It is commanded by a three-star ranking Director General of the Territorial Army—a Lieutenant General-ranking officer deputed from the Indian Army—and headed by the Chief of Defence Staff under the Department of Military Affairs of the Ministry of Defence. The TA has two units—a departmental unit consisting of Public sector undertakings in India (PSU) and Indian Railway employees, and ex-servicemen; and a non-departmental unit consisting of privately employed citizens.

The TA has participated in all of India's wars since the country's independence, including the Sino-Indian War of 1962, Indo-Pakistani War of 1965, Indo-Pakistani War of 1971, and the Kargil War. The TA have also taken part in Operation Pawan (1987) in Sri Lanka, Operation Rakshak in Punjab and Jammu and Kashmir, Operation Rhino (1991) and Operation Bajrang (1990–1991) in Northeast India, and Operation Parakram in Jammu and Kashmir.

Those joining the TA must be employed in mainstay civilian professions or be self-employed. Members undergo two months of mandatory paid service each year. The TA says it "does not provide a full time career", although there is no restriction. Soldiers often prefer to remain embodied for longer periods. TA personnel are entitled to all benefits available to the Indian Army, except gratuity and pension, which are based on number of full years served.

History
When the English East India Company reached Surat in 1612, it created a body of part-time soldiers consisting the company's employees to defend its commercial interests. In 1687, it created Companie of Trained Bands by the order of the Governor and Council of Fort St. George, a part-time force that was based in Madras to defend against the rival French East India Company and native princely states. The  also participated in the Battle of Plassey on 23 June 1757. Many of its part-time units were converted into regular and irregular forces.

After the Indian Rebellion of 1857, the British Crown took over Indian administration from the company and existing part-time forces were re-organised, creating the Volunteer Force (VFI) by an act of law. With the expansion of British rule in India, full-time regular forces gained prominence. The VFI was engaged in military conflicts both in India and abroad, including the Second Boer War and the First World War. The VFI was later re-organised and replaced with the Indian Defence Force (IDF).

The IDF, incorporating Europeans and Indians in separate sections, was formed by the Imperial Legislative Council on 9 October 1917 to release regular troops from garrison duties during World War I. Indians were volunteers while Europeans were conscripted. The Indian Defence Force Act 1917 made military service compulsory for all European males except the clergy between the ages of 16 and 50 permanently residing in British India, including princely states. Those between 16 and 18 were only obliged to undertake training, while men over 40 had to serve in their local district. Men between 19 and 40 were obliged to serve anywhere required within British India.

The IDF's youth wing named University Corps (UC) was created at the universities of Calcutta, Bombay, Madras and Allahabad. The IDF was generally unpopular among British conscripts. In 1920, it was replaced by two volunteer organisations; the Auxiliary Force (AFI) for European and Anglo-Indian officers, and the Indian Territorial Force (ITF) for Indian other ranks. The UC was re-organised as University Training Corps (UTC) under the ITF, and was later renamed University Officers' Training Corps (UOTC). After India's independence, the AFI was disbanded because its services were no longer required, the ITF was restructured into newly formed Territorial Army and the UOTC was converted into the National Cadet Corps (NCC).

Post-independence, the Territorial Army Bill was introduced in the Constituent Assembly, as the Indian Parliament was then known, on 23 August 1948; it was passed on 1 September and came into force on 10 September. It enabled civilians pursuing other professions to serve part-time in the army. The TA was constituted by re-organising and re-designating 11 ITF infantry units. The first TA camp was inaugurated by the first Governor-General of independent India C. Rajagopalachari, on 9 October 1949. Since then, the annual Territorial Army Day is observed on 9 October. During the India-China conflict in 1959, defence minister V. K. Krishna Menon, in a radio address, asked Indians to volunteer for the TA.

The Territorial Army initially had various types of units, such as Armoured Regiment (TA), Infantry Battalion (TA), Air Defence (TA), Medical Regiment (TA), Engineers Field Park Coy (TA), Signal Regiment (TA), EME Workshop (TA), Coast Battery (TA), ASC GT Coy (TA), ASC Compo Pl (TA), and AMC Field Ambulances (TA). By 1972, these units,  except infantry battalions, were either disbanded or became part of the regular army.

Role
By law, the Territorial Army is an integral part of the Indian Army, whose composition is defined in the Part I of the Defence Services Regulations, which states; "the army comprises regular army, regular reserves, and the Territorial Army". Part-time TA personnel may fall within the definition of regular army when attached to a unit. The Territorial Army Act 1948 states, for the purpose of sections 128, 130, and 131 of the Code of Criminal Procedure (CrPC); "all officers, non-commissioned officers and other enrolled persons who have been attached to a unit shall be deemed to be officers, non-commissioned officers and soldiers respectively of the Regular Army". This is further complimented in the Army Act, 1950, which defines regular army as "regular army means officers, junior commissioned officers, warrant officers, non-commissioned officers and other enrolled persons who, by their commission, warrant, terms of enrolment or otherwise, are liable to render continuously for a term military service to the [Indian] Union in any part of the world, including persons belonging to the Reserve Forces and the Territorial Army when called out on permanent service".

According to the TA Act 1948; "every officer or enrolled person shall be liable to perform military service: (a) when called out in the prescribed manner to act in support of the civil power or to provide essential guards; (b) when embodied in the prescribed manner for training or for supporting or supplementing the regular forces; and (c) when attached to any regular forces either at his own request or under the prescribed conditions". The act also says no personnel has any liability to serve beyond the "limits of India" unless under a General or by a special order of the Government of India.

The concept of the TA was redefined multiple times by TA Review Committee nominated by the Government of India. The first review of 1971 defined it as "... to provide part-time military training to gainfully employed citizens of the nation"; and the 1982 review said "... TA should be based on part-time and full-time units and recruitment to be all citizens who fulfil the prescribed standard, while in consonance with the traditional concept, every effort should be made to enroll gainfully employed persons". The third review, in 1995, recommended a restructure to make it a tri-service organisation, including the Indian Navy and the Indian Air Force, named the Indian Territorial Force; and passage of the Indian Territorial Force Act.

As per Army Order. 77/1984, the present role of the TA is to "relieve the regular army from static duties and assist civil administration in dealing with natural calamities and maintenance of essential services in situations where life of the communities is affected or the security of the country is threatened and to provide units for regular army as and when required".

At the time of its inception, the TA was well-received by the Indian Army, Navy ann Air Force, but the concept was eroded and confined to some infantry and departmental units of the Indian Army. Former Indian Army colonel and columnist Balwan Singh Nagial wrote the "expansion of the regular army certainly overshadowed the concept of TA. Instead, it should have happened the other way around, keeping in view the cost-effectiveness of TA". In February 2020, General Bipin Rawat stated "TAisation of defence forces" is a way to reduce the cost of running the military. After the restructuring of the Indian Armed Forces by introducing the Chief of Defence Staff and the Department of Military Affairs in March 2020, the TA's focus expanded to include more operational and intelligence-gathering roles to cut costs of the Indian Army. In 2020, the TA was in a phase of gradual expansion.

Activities

Territorial Army units were actively involved in military operations in the Sino-Indian War of 1962, Indo-Pakistani War of 1965, Indo-Pakistani War of 1971 and the Kargil War. The TA has participated in all wars since independence; subsequently, many of its air defence and artillery units were converted into regular army units. The TA also took part in Operation Pawan (1987) in Sri Lanka, Operation Rakshak in Punjab and Jammu and Kashmir, and Operation Rhino (1991) and Operation Bajrang (1990–1991) in Northeast India. Departmental units assisted the civil authorities during industrial unrest and natural calamities, particularly the 1991 Uttarkashi earthquake, the 1993 Latur earthquake and the 1999 Odisha cyclone.

The TA, as part of the Indian Peace Keeping Force, was involved in peacekeeping activities in Sri Lanka from 29 July 1987 to 24 March 1990. Since the early 1990s, units have been actively deployed in Jammu and Kashmir, Northeast India, and along India's northern and western borders. According to a 2021 report, approximately 75 percent of TA units are deployed in counter-insurgency and counter-terrorism-prone areas in these regions. Since 1994, many TA soldiers serve as regular troops in counter-insurgency areas like Jammu and Kashmir for up to three years. The TA participated in rescue and relief operations following the 2001 Gujarat earthquake and protected oil installations in Vadodara during the riots the followed the Godhra train burning incident in 2002.

The  TA has also participated in mountaineering activities. The joint Indo-British TA Mountaineering Expedition scaled Mount Kokthang in October 1982 and September 1994, and Mount Tenchenkhang in May 1998 in West Sikkim. In 2020, plans to increase the presence of TA personnel in the Andaman and Nicobar Islands were made due to concerns about Chinese intrusion.

On the night of 29 June 2022, a landslide occurred at the company location of 107 Infantry Battalion (TA) near Tupul railway station in Manipur that had been deployed to protect the under-construction Jiribam–Imphal line; 30 TA personnel died and one went missing and was later declared dead. The family of each TA serviceperson received more than ₹1 crore in compensation and benefits, and future benefits for their children. In July 2022, the TA started recruiting Mandarin-language graduates as officers as part of an effort by the Indian Army to increase its expertise in Mandarin and Tibetology amid the 2020–2022 China–India skirmishes and efforts of China's People's Liberation Army to recruit Hindi interpreters for posting in Tibet Autonomous Region.

Organisation
Until 2020, the TA was headed by an Additional Directorate General of Territorial Army (ADG TA); this role was held by a Major General-ranking officer of the Indian Army, and came under the office of the Chief of the Army Staff (COAS). From March 2020 onward, following a restructuring of the Indian Armed Forces by the Government of India, the TA is now headed by a Director General of Territorial Army (DG TA); this role is held by a Lieutenant General-ranking officer from Indian Army, and comes under the office of the Chief of Defence Staff (CDS) of the newly created Department of Military Affairs, which is under the Ministry of Defence. Lieutenant General Devendra Pratap Pandey was the first DG TA and General Bipin Rawat was the first CDS of the Indian Armed Forces.

The TA is composed of departmental TA units such as Indian Railways, Oil and Natural Gas Corporation, Indian Oil Corporation, Bharat Petroleum Corporation Limited, and Hindustan Petroleum Corporation Limited; Ecological Task Force battalions, non-departmental TA units of infantry battalions, home and hearth, and engineers regiments affiliated to various infantry regiments. The non-departmental units are funded by the Ministry of Defence while the departmental units are funded by state governments and Ministry of Petroleum and Natural Gas, Ministry of Railways, Ministry of Environment, Forest and Climate Change.

Group headquarters
 TA GP HQ, Southern Command – Pune, Maharashtra - 13 infantry, 4 departmental units (railway, oil, marketing), 2 ETF
 TA GP HQ, Eastern Command – Kolkata, West Bengal
 TA GP HQ, Western Command – Chandigarh
 TA GP HQ, Central Command – Lucknow, Uttar Pradesh
 TA GP HQ, Northern Command – Udhampur, Jammu & Kashmir

Zones
There are zonal divisions and recruitments are zonal based.

 Zone I – Haryana, Himachal Pradesh, Jammu and Kashmir, Punjab, Delhi, and Chandigarh.
 Zone II – Bihar, Madhya Pradesh, Odisha, Uttar Pradesh, Jharkhand, Chhattisgarh, and Uttarakhand.
 Zone III – Assam, Meghalaya, Manipur, Tripura, Nagaland, Sikkim, West Bengal, Mizoram, Arunachal Pradesh, and Andaman and Nicobar Islands.
 Zone IV – Andhra Pradesh, Gujarat, Kerala, Tamil Nadu, Rajasthan, Maharashtra, Karnataka, Goa, Dadra and Nagar Haveli and Daman and Diu, Lakshdweep, and Pondicherry.

Departmental units
801 Engineer Regiment R&P (TA) was formed as a Departmental Territorial Army unit on 1 March 1983 at Agra Fort under the Ministry of Petroleum, Chemicals & Fertilizers; later renamed as Ministry of Petroleum and Natural Gas (MoPNG). The unit was formed to operate oil refineries & pipelines in an emergency, and to cater for the Indian Oil Corporation. In 1985, the unit's scope was extended to other oil companies. The duties of oil-sector units are technical in nature. During their embodied service in the TA, these personnel perform the jobs they were doing in their civilian roles.

In the early 1980s, the fragile ecology of the Sivalik Hills and the environmental stability of the Mussoorie hills deteriorated due to illegal limestone mining, increasing the rate of desertification. Norman Borlaug, the director of Mexico's International Maize and Wheat Improvement Center proposed to India's prime minister Indira Gandhi to use the Indian Army to recover the region's ecology. The government decided to raise TA units by enrolling ex-servicemen with the dual aim of rejuvenating the ecology and the settlement of ex-servicemen. Units were raised under the aegis of the Ministry of Environment, Forest and Climate Change and the Ministry of Defense in conjunction with state governments. It was recommended that each state have one ETF unit to operate for state forestry departments. The first Ecological Task Force Battalion was raised on 1 December 1982; as of 2021, there were 10 ETF units carrying out afforestation activities in rugged and ecologically degraded areas.

In 2018, the Composite Ecological Task Force (CETF), also called Ganga Task Force, was raised as part of the Namami Gange Programme of the National Mission for Clean Ganga (NMCG), which aimed to maintain the cleanliness of the Ganges river. The unit comprises ex-servicemen whom the Central Pollution Control Board trains to test the river water. They also carry out afforestation activities on the rover's banks. The CETF was raised after a proposal by the Department of Ex-servicemen Welfare.

On 3 June 2022, after reviewing a report by a constituted committee and with the agreement of the Ministry of Defence and Directorate General of Territorial Army (DGTA), the Ministry of Railways disbanded five out of the six Railway Engineers Regiments (TA) that were based at Jhansi, Kota, Adra, Chandigarh, and Secunderabad, keeping only the Jamalpur regiment for operational duties along the critical,  New Jalpaiguri-Siliguri-Newmal-Alipurduar-Rangiya  rail link through the  Siliguri Corridor and to Rangiya as proposed by the Ministry of Defence. The disbandment process was to be completed by the DGTA within nine months.

Several hospitals are affiliated with the Territorial Army, such as General Hospital (TA) at Kolkata, Allahabad, Jaipur, Patiala, Guwāhāti, Ahmadabad, and Rohtak. These units are activated to treat army personnel during wartime. In 2009, the TA activated M & J Institute of Ophthalmology, Ahmedabad, after 30 years to perform a mock drill.

Current units

Non-departmental units
The decision to raise Home and Hearth (H&H) units was taken in 2003–2004, and was based on the "sons of soil" model. The 162 Infantry Battalion TA JAK LI (H&H) is exclusively for Ikhwans. The H&H personnel are recruited only from Jammu and Kashmir. H&H units are deployed in northern and eastern regions of the state and 70 percent of the infantry battalion troops are send for counterinsurgency duties. Three Engineer Regiments were raised for maintenance of the Line of Control.

Current units

Personnel
The Territorial Army has a strength of more than 43,000 first-line troops and 160,000 second-line troops, as of 2019.

Rank structure 

Officers

JCO and Other Ranks

Training

Non-departmental
Urban systems of training
Training is carried out on weekends and holidays. Four hours of training is counted as one day.
 Recruit Training: 32 days in the first year only including a camp of not less than 4 days if the trainee volunteers with the written consent of his employer, if any.
 Annual Training: A minimum of 30 days, with extensions up to a maximum of 60 days including a camp for 14 days.
 Post Commission Training: All Officers are required to undergo 10 weeks of Post commission Training within two years of their commissioning.
 Voluntary training: To gain additional military training, provided the trainee volunteers with the written consent of the employer if any.

Provincial systems of training
 Recruit Training: For a continuous period of 30 days in the first year only.
 Annual Training: For a continuous period of two calendar months in the first and subsequent years.
 Post commission Training: 10 weeks post commission training is compulsory within two years of commissioning.
 Voluntary training: To gain additional military training, provided the trainee volunteers with the written consent of his employer, if any.

Departmental
 Recruit Training: Carried out for a continuous period of 30 days in the first year in a camp. No training for Medical and Nursing officers of General Hospital (TA).
 Annual Training: In the first and subsequent years annual training is carried out for a continuous period of 30 days in a camp. For officers of General Hospital (TA), this is carried out on weekends, without a camp, four hours training being counted as one day.
 Post commission training: 30 days post commission training within two years of commissioning is compulsory for all Departmental TA officers, except Medical officers of Railway (TA) units and officers of General Hospitals (TA).
 Voluntary Training: Departmental TA personnel who volunteer with the specific consent of their departments can be attached for voluntary training.

Celebrity members
 Rao Birender Singh, Former Chief Minister of Haryana
Kamakhya Prasad Singh Deo, former Cabinet Minister.
Kapil Dev, the former cricketer was conferred with an honorary rank of lieutenant colonel in the TA on 24 September 2008.
 Mohanlal was conferred with an honorary rank of lieutenant colonel on 9 July 2009. Earlier, he had shown interest in joining the TA, but since he exceeded the age limit of 42 years, the army decided to confer him with an honorary rank instead, as a goodwill ambassador for promoting TA among the youth.
 Abhinav Bindra was conferred with the rank of honorary lieutenant colonel on 1 November 2011 for his contribution in the field of shooting.
 Deepak Rao, a military trainer in close quarter battle was conferred with an honorary rank of major in the TA on 1 November 2011.
 Mahendra Singh Dhoni was conferred with the rank of honorary lieutenant colonel on 1 November 2011 for his contribution in the field of cricket.
 Sachin Pilot, former Deputy Chief Minister of Rajasthan. Pilot became the first Union Minister of India to be commissioned as an officer in the TA on 6 September 2012.
 Anurag Thakur, MP from Hamirpur has been commissioned to the rank of lieutenant on 29 July 2016.
 Manvendra Singh, a politician and member of the Indian National Congress.

Sports and band
The Territorial Army has a multi-purpose stadium in Amravati, Maharashtra, called the Territorial Army Parade Ground, which was formerly known as Reforms Club Ground, that hosts mostly cricket matches. TA personnel engage in sporting activities such as volleyball and basketball. They also participate in army shooting competitions and conduct competitions such as TA inter-battalion football and volleyball events. In 2016, the 118 Infantry Battalion (TA) and the Cycle Polo Federation of India jointly organized the National Cycle Polo Championship, TA won the men's senior division. TA lost to Air Force Cycle Polo team in the National Cycle Polo Championship (2021–22). The TA has also organised golfing competitions.

The TA has a military band named Territorial Army Symphony. It was raised in 2009 and has more than 40 musicians, playing brass, strings, and Indian classical instruments. The band performs both contemporary and traditional music.

Awards and decorations
TA personnel have received many awards and decorations. As of 2021, these include one Ashok Chakra, one Kirti Chakra, five Ati Vishisht Seva Medals, five Vir Chakras, five Shaurya Chakra, one Yudh Seva Medal, 78 Sena Medals, 28 Vishisht Seva Medals, 17 Mentioned-in-Dispatches, and 280 COAS commendation cards.

Gallery

See also
 National Cadet Corps

References

External links
 
 Territorial Army (TA) at GlobalSecurity.org
 Evolution of Territorial Army article at Sainik Samachar

1949 establishments in India
Army units and formations of India
Military units and formations established in 1949
Units of the Indian Peace Keeping Force